Highland, Minnesota may refer to:

Highland, Fillmore County, Minnesota
Highland, Lake County, Minnesota
Highland, Wright County, Minnesota
Highland Township, Wabasha County, Minnesota